Big Brother: Xtremo, also known as Big Brother Angola e Moçambique, is the third season of the Angolan version and the first of the Mozambican version of the Big Brother reality television franchise produced by Endemol for DStv. This season, unlike the previous two, is a joint season between Angola and Mozambique having each half of the housemates. Angolan Dicla Burity continued as the host of the show and was joined by Mozambican host Emerson Miranda. The season started on 20 March 2016 and finish 64 days later on 22 May 2016.

Housemates 
Leonel had already participated on Big Brother Africa 4 representing Mozambique. On Day 2, after Caprichoso's eviction, El Dio and Queen Pink entered the house.

Nomination history
Each housemate nominates one fellow housemate from  Angola and another from  Mozambique.

Notes

: As Head of Household, Maura had the power to evict one housemate.  On Day 2, she decided to evict Carapichoso. After Caprichoso's eviction, El Dio and Queen Pink entered the house.
: On Day 3, Carol became new Head of Household. She used her power as Head of Household to bring Carapichoso back into the house.
: As Head of Household, Tucha had the power to save one housemate from eviction. She decided to save Matilde and replace Filly for eviction.
: This week's nominations and evictions were fake and four new fake housemates entered the house: Diana, Bruno, Sheron and Young Cash. As housemates thought they were official housemates, they could nominate them (in italic) and they nominated as well. Diana nominated Mistake and El Dio, Bruno nominated El Dio and Mistake, Sheron nominated Ivan and El Dio and Young Cash nominated Ivan and Diana.

References

External links 
 Official Site

Big Brother (franchise) seasons
Portuguese-language television shows
2016 Angolan television seasons
2016 Mozambican television seasons